The 2011–12 season was the club's 103rd season, having been founded as Dundee Hibernian in 1909. Dundee United competed in the Scottish Premier League, Europa League, Scottish Cup and the League Cup.

Results and fixtures

Pre season

Scottish Premier League

Scottish Cup

Scottish League Cup

Europa League

Player statistics

Captains

Squad information
Last updated 14 May 2012

 

|}

Disciplinary record
Includes all competitive matches. 
Last updated 14 May 2012

Team statistics

League table

Division summary

Transfers

Players In

Players Out

References

Dundee United
Dundee United F.C. seasons
Dundee United